was a Japanese journalist, newscaster and essayist.

Life
Graduated from Tochiku High School in Fukuoka Prefecture, Japan, and from Tokyo University. He began working for the Asahi Shimbun, a Japanese newspaper company. He was dispatched to Nomonhan as a war correspondent and reported the Battles of Khalkhin Gol. Between May 1963 and May 1970, he wrote essays in Tensei Jingo column as a member of the Asahi editorial board. He served as a main caster of JNN's News Scope, broadcast on TBS (Tokyo Broadcasting System Television) from October 1969 to March 1981.

Books
Tokuro Irie and Shozo Oogiya Scoops not reported  Hanashi Sha, 1948 which was the original of the film Midday duel.
Tokuro Irie Crybaby newspaperman Masu Shobou, 1950
Tokuro Irie Samurai newspaperman Masu Shobou, 1954

References
Person Reference Dictionary, Nichigai Associates, 2000, p. 253
20th Century Japanese Biographical Dictionary, from A to Se p. 329

Japanese journalists
Japanese essayists
Japanese broadcast news analysts
The Asahi Shimbun people
1913 births
1989 deaths
20th-century essayists
20th-century journalists